The 1942–43 Detroit Red Wings season was the 17th season of the Detroit NHL franchise, eleventh as the 'Red Wings.' The highlight of the Red Wings season was winning the Stanley Cup.

Offseason

Regular season

Final standings

Record vs. opponents

Schedule and results

Player statistics

Regular season
Scoring

Goaltending

Playoffs
Scoring

Goaltending

Note: GP = Games played; G = Goals; A = Assists; Pts = Points; +/- = Plus-minus PIM = Penalty minutes; PPG = Power-play goals; SHG = Short-handed goals; GWG = Game-winning goals;
      MIN = Minutes played; W = Wins; L = Losses; T = Ties; GA = Goals against; GAA = Goals-against average;  SO = Shutouts;

Playoffs

Boston Bruins vs. Detroit Red Wings

Detroit wins best-of-seven series 4–0.

Awards and records

References
 Red Wings on Hockey Database

Detroit
Detroit
Detroit Red Wings seasons
Stanley Cup championship seasons
Detroit Red Wings
Detroit Red Wings